Amy Vedder (born March 24, 1951 in Palatine Bridge, New York) is an ecologist and primatologist involved in conservation work with mountain gorillas. She was the Class of 1969 valedictorian at Canajoharie High School, Canajoharie, New York, and a 1973 graduate of Swarthmore College.

Vedder worked in Africa for the Peace Corps from 1973 to 1975. There she and her husband William Weber (Bill) worked in a small boarding school in rural south central Zaire. She taught the girls there by reminding them "You're special -- don't ever forget that". One day they asked her why she changed her name to her husband's if she believed everyone was special. She then decided to change her last name from Weber back to Vedder upon returning to the United States. Her time in Zaire inspired her interest in wildlife conservation. This feeling intensified at Zaire's Kahuzi-Biega National Park where she observed Casimir, an enormous male eastern lowland gorilla. This encounter made her want to work with wildlife in Africa after the Peace Corps.

In 1975, Vedder returned to the United States where she began searching for a graduate school where they could launch her career in wildlife conservation. She and Bill chose the University of Wisconsin–Madison. From one of their graduate program's classmates, the couple learned about British primatologist Richard Wrangham who recently visited Karisoke Research Center in Rwanda's Volcanoes National Park. In October 1977 they met Dian Fossey in Chicago, where she accepted their research proposal and set a tentative date for their arrival in Rwanda.

In 1978 she arrived in Rwanda with her husband to study gorillas at Karisoke, the research station run by Fossey. They arrived right after poachers has killed a mountain gorilla named Digit who was famous due to Fossey's research. The couple had secured research funding from the Wildlife Conservation Society. There she tried to nurse a wounded gorilla name Mweza back to health but did not succeed. This experience left her and Bill angry. With that anger, they chose to focus on ways to help the gorilla population. Amy followed Gorilla Group 5 and wrote down everything they ate and where. This information helped her figure out the type of habitat and how much the gorillas needed. After six weeks of following the group, the gorillas started to accept her presence for longer periods of time. She took notes on a specific gorilla in the group each day, noting how often and what the gorilla ate.

After getting a doctorate at the University of Wisconsin–Madison in 1989, she became Biodiversity Coordinator for the Wildlife Conservation Society, and later director of the conservation of the society's Africa Program.

One of Vedder's contributions was to implement the Mountain Gorilla Project, which sought to involve local Rwandans and use ecotourism to help conserve the gorillas.

Bibliography

References

External links 
 Profile at American Museum of Natural History
 Faculty page at Yale University

American ecologists
Women ecologists
1951 births
Swarthmore College alumni
University of Wisconsin–Madison alumni
Living people
Wildlife Conservation Society people
Women primatologists
Primatologists